Taman Suria is a suburb in the city of Johor Bahru, Johor, Malaysia. The famous elementary school Sekolah Kebangsaan Taman Suria is located here.

Johor Bahru
Towns and suburbs in Johor Bahru District